The Luge competition at the 2006 Winter Olympic Games was held at Cesana Pariol in Cesana, Italy. Three events were staged, taking place from February 11 to February 15. These were the first games where a qualifying system was used to determine the enterants into the games.

Medal summary

Medal table

Events

Participating NOCs
Twenty-four nations competed in the luge events at Torino.

References

Luge at the 2006 Winter Olympics

 
2006 Winter Olympics events
2006
2006 in luge